Fotini G. Markopoulou-Kalamara (born April 3, 1971) is a Greek theoretical physicist interested in quantum gravity, foundational mathematics, quantum mechanics and a design engineer working on embodied cognition technologies.  Markopoulou is co-founder and CEO of Empathic Technologies. She was a founding faculty member at Perimeter Institute for Theoretical Physics and was an adjunct professor at the University of Waterloo.

Quantum gravity
Markopoulou received her PhD from Imperial College London in 1998 and held postdoctoral positions at the Max Planck Institute for Gravitational Physics, Imperial College London, and Pennsylvania State University. She shared First Prize in the Young Researchers competition at the Ultimate Reality Symposium in Princeton, New Jersey.

She has been influenced by researchers such as Christopher Isham who call attention to the unstated assumption in most modern physics that physical properties are most naturally calibrated by a real-number continuum. She, and others, attempt to make explicit some of the implicit mathematical assumptions underpinning modern theoretical physics and cosmology.

In her interdisciplinary paper "The Internal Description of a Causal Set: What the Universe Looks Like from the Inside", Markopoulou instantiates some abstract terms from mathematical category theory to develop straightforward models of space-time. It proposes simple quantum models of space-time based on category-theoretic notions of a topos and its subobject classifier (which has a Heyting algebra structure, but not necessarily a Boolean algebra structure).

For example, hard-to-picture category-theoretic "presheaves" from topos theory become easy-to-picture "evolving (or varying) sets" in her discussions of quantum spacetime. The diagrams in Markopoulou's papers (including hand-drawn diagrams in one of the earlier versions of "The Internal Description of a Causal Set") are straightforward presentations of possible models of space-time. They are intended as meaningful and provocative, not just for specialists but also for newcomers.

In May 2006, Markopoulou published a paper with Lee Smolin that further popularized this Causal dynamical triangulation (CDT) theory by explaining the time-slicing of the Ambjorn–Loll CDT model as a result of gauge fixing. Their approach relaxed the definition of the Ambjorn–Loll CDT model in 1 + 1 dimensions to allow for a varying lapse.

Quantum graphity
In 2008, Markopoulou, Tomasz Konopka, Mohammad H. Ansari, and Simone Severini initiated the study of a new background independent model of evolutionary space called quantum graphity.

In the quantum graphity model, points in spacetime are represented by nodes on a graph connected by links that can be on or off. This indicates whether or not the two points are directly connected as if they are next to each other in spacetime. When they are on the links have additional state variables which are used to define the random dynamics of the graph under the influence of quantum fluctuations and temperature. At high temperature the graph is in Phase I where all the points are randomly connected to each other and no concept of spacetime as we know it exists. As the temperature drops and the graph cools, it is conjectured to undergo a phase transition to Phase II where spacetime forms. It will then look like a spacetime manifold on large scales with only near-neighbor points being connected in the graph.

The hypothesis of quantum graphity is that this geometrogenesis models the condensation of spacetime in the big bang. A second model, related to ideas around quantum graphity, has been published.

Markopoulou is one of the quantum gravity researchers that uses the quantum computation framework to formulate new quantum theories of gravity. In her paper The Computing Spacetime she has given an easily accessible overview of these ideas.

Innovation Design Engineering
After Perimeter's director Neil Turok did not allow her to apply for tenure, Markopoulou left Perimeter in the fall of 2011.  In a move away from physics in 2012, Markopoulou enrolled and studied on the Innovation Design Engineering double masters (MA+MSc) at Imperial College London and the Royal College of Art, graduating in 2014. Her two graduation projects were a solo project: Cityzen, a digital voting system using values-based data analytics, and MyTempo, a group project with Nell Bennett, Andreas Bilicki and Jack Hooper. MyTempo won the Deutsche Bank Award for Creative Enterprise (Design Category) 2014 and was exhibited at the John Lewis Future Store.

In 2014, Markopoulou received a double MSc from The Royal College of Art and Imperial College London in Innovation Design Engineering (IDE), an interdisciplinary course that focuses on the exploration and development of impactful innovation through critical observation, disruptive design thinking, experimentation, exploration of emergent technologies, advanced engineering and enterprise activities. Her Masters thesis was a digital voting system that makes the rich landscape of our voices tangible, reducing the distractions of democracy and the effort required by people and government to participate.

After graduating Markopoulou and her colleagues founded doppel, a company that researches psycho-physiology, the way in which a person's mind and body affect one-another, to create technology that changes how people perceive, feel and behave. MyTempo was rebranded to become doppel and in June 2015 was launched on Kickstarter.

Empathic Technologies

Markopoulou is co-founder and CEO of Empathic Technologies, 
a tech company that uses research in psychophysiology to create technology that changes how the user perceives, feels and behaves. Empathic Technologies won the Best Female-Led Investment 2018 Award from the UK Business Angels Association.

The company’s first product, doppel, is a wristband that reduces stress. Peer-reviewed trial results found that Doppel had a significant calming effect during a socially stressful situation.

Personal life
Markopoulou lives in Oxford, England, with her husband Doyne Farmer and their son Maris. Markopoulou has two previous marriages to Lee Smolin and Olaf Dreyer.

See also
 List of University of Waterloo people

References

External links
 Fotini Markopoulou, The Internal Description of a Causal Set: What the Universe Looks Like from the Inside (1999)
 Related seminar  (1998)
 
Creating Spacetime - a lecture presented by Fotini Markopoulou at the Quantum to Cosmos festival.
Davies, Sally (29 July 2019) "This Physics Pioneer Walked Away from It All" . Nautilus. 
Farmer, D, Markopoulou, F, Beinhocker, E and Rasmussen, S (11 February 2020) "Collaborators in Creation", Aeon. 

1971 births
Living people
Greek women physicists
21st-century Greek physicists
Greek academics
Alumni of Imperial College London
Alumni of Queen Mary University of London
Alumni of the Royal College of Art
Academics of Imperial College London
Scientists from Athens